Rabi al-Abrar wa nusus al-Akhbar  are classical books written about Islam by Mu'tazili Islamic Scholar Zamakhshari.

Other transliterations include "Rabi ul-Abrar", "Rabi' al-Abrar", "Rabi-ul-Abrar", "Rabi'ul Abrar" and "Rabi' ul Abrar".

Impact 
It has been used as a reference by books such as Peshawar Nights and scholars like Badruddin Shibli (died 769 A.H.)

References 

Islamic literature